Nedelya was a Russian liberal-Narodnik political and literary newspaper, published in Saint Petersburg from 1866 to 1901.

Nedelya was the weekend supplement of the soviet newspaper Izvestia.

External links 
"Nedelya" digital archives in "Newspapers on the web and beyond", the digital resource of the National Library of Russia

References

Newspapers published in the Russian Empire
Defunct newspapers published in Russia
Mass media in Saint Petersburg
Newspapers published in Russia
Publications established in 1866
Publications disestablished in 1901
Russian-language newspapers